Paraphago rostratus is a species of distichodontid fish endemic to the Democratic Republic of Congo.  It is the only species in its genus.

References
 

Distichodontidae
Monotypic fish genera
Fish of Africa
Taxa named by George Albert Boulenger
Endemic fauna of the Democratic Republic of the Congo